Budapest Ferenc Liszt International Airport , formerly known as Budapest Ferihegy International Airport and still commonly called just Ferihegy, is the international airport serving the Hungarian capital city of Budapest. It is by far the largest of the country's four commercial airports, ahead of Debrecen and Hévíz–Balaton.

It offers international connections primarily within Europe, but also to Africa, to the Middle East, to North America and to the Far East. In 2019, the airport handled 16.2 million passengers.  The airport is the headquarters and primary hub for Wizz Air and base for Ryanair. In 2012 it experienced a significant drop in aircraft movements and handled cargo, primarily due to the collapse of Malév Hungarian Airlines earlier in the year, hence losing a large portion of connecting passengers. It had been the hub for Malév until the airline's bankruptcy on 3 February 2012.

In 2015, North-American and Middle-Eastern carriers announced direct flights to Budapest. In 2018, LOT Polish Airlines made Budapest their first hub outside Poland, launching with year-round flights to New York-JFK and Chicago-ORD. In 2018, American Airlines resumed flights to Budapest. American Airlines this time flew from Philadelphia, after flights from New York-JFK were suspended in 2011. PHL-BUD operated for the two summers of 2018 and 2019, May–October, and was planned to continue the following summers as well. Chicago-ORD flights were planned to start in 2020, but were axed in April 2020, just a month before the inaugural flight. LOT Polish Airlines axed their Chicago-ORD flight in August 2019, just days after American Airlines announced plans to operate the same route starting May 2020. Nowadays, the Budapest hub of Wizz Air is the largest of all with more than 60 destinations.

Name
Originally called Budapest Ferihegy International Airport (Budapest Ferihegy Nemzetközi Repülőtér), on 25 March 2011 it was officially renamed Budapest Liszt Ferenc International Airport in honor of the Hungarian pianist and composer Franz Liszt (Modern Hungarian: Liszt Ferenc). Popularly, the airport is still called Ferihegy as before.

Ferihegy is the name of the neighborhood around the airport. The name is derived from that of Ferenc Xavér Mayerffy (1776–1845), the former owner of an estate who established vineyards and contributed to the development of viticulture in Pest-Buda. "Feri" is a diminutive form of Ferenc while "hegy" means mountain. In fact, the area is almost totally flat; but originally there was a 147 m high sandy hillock which was leveled in the 1940s during the construction of the airport.

History

Designing and construction (1939–1944)
In 1938, the idea of building a new airport in Budapest was born. The area in the boundary of three settlements (Pestszentlőrinc, Rákoshegy and Vecsés) was assigned as the area of the new airport. The airport was intended as jointly for civil-military-sporting purposes. Civil facilities were to be built up in the northwestern section and military ones in the southwestern section. Just as for each building, a public tender was invited for the designing and construction of the traffic building.

In December 1939, upon an announcement of the results of the tender invited in September that year, the designs of Károly Dávid Jr. (1903–1973) were chosen. The designer, who was one of the originators of modern Hungarian architectural art, dreamt of a building which resembled an aircraft from the top-side view. The work commenced in 1942.

The military buildings were constructed parallel to the civil construction from 1940 but, due to the war situation, faster. Aviation started at the airport in 1943. In wartime, the civil construction slowed down and then stopped at the beginning of 1944. Towards the end of World War II, many of the airport buildings were damaged. By the end of 1944, Budapest and its airport were under Soviet occupation.

Reconstruction (1947–1950)
In 1947, it was decided that the airport would be reconstructed for civil aviation. Under the three-year plan, 40 million forints were voted for those works. The opening ceremony was held in May 1950 and the sections finished allowed Magyar-Szovjet Polgári Légiforgalmi Rt. (Hungarian-Soviet Civil Aviation Co. Ltd. – MASZOVLET), established in 1946, to operate here. At that time the airlines operated only a few foreign flights, in particular, those to Prague, Bucharest, Warsaw, and Sofia.

Magyar Légiforgalmi Vállalat (Hungarian Airlines – Malév) was established on 25 November 1954. The first regular flight taking off from the airport to the West was the Malév's flight into Vienna in summer 1956. The first Western airline which launched a flight to Budapest was KLM Royal Dutch Airlines in 1957. The traffic building was finished in this period and the lengthening works of the  runway were started.

Continued growth (1960–1980)

Between its opening and 1960, the number of landings at the Airport increased from 4,786 to 17,133, with passenger traffic increasing from 49,955 to 359,338 by 1960.

In 1965, a study was made on the development of the airport, which was implemented with more than a 10-year delay from the end of the 1970s. Aviation, airport, and flight control all called for more capacity and infrastructure. The Aviation and Airport Directorate (LRI) was established on 1 January 1973 and performed as an airline company, a trading company, and an authority, as well as investment, operator, and air navigation tasks.

In 1974, passenger traffic reached one million. In 1977, a new control tower was built, as well as a second runway parallel to the old one and a technical base for maintaining MALÉV aircraft. Use of the new  runway was started in September 1983.

New infrastructure (1980–2000)

In 1980, the number of landing aircraft and passengers served reached 32,642 and 1,780,000, respectively. The growing number of passengers called for more capacity. A new terminal was decided upon. The foundation-stone of the new passenger traffic building to be built was laid down on 16 November 1983.  Since 1 November 1985, passengers have been received in Terminal 2, a 24,000-square-meter facility funded with Austrian loans under general contracting. It was used first by Malév aircraft and passengers, and then by those of Lufthansa, Air France, and Swissair. The old terminal continued to receive residual airline traffic under a new name, Terminal 1. 

There was an IED bus attack against Russian Jewish emigrants on the road leading to Ferihegy in the early 1990s. The perpetrators were members of the German Communist organisation Red Army Faction.

In 1993, Malév launched the airport's first Hungarian overseas flight, to New York. According to the traffic figures forecast for the millennium, the two terminals serving 4 million passengers a year promised to be insufficient.  The construction of Terminal 2B was started in 1997. The new building, with more than 30,000 square meters of space, together with a new apron, was opened in 1998, with all foreign airlines moving there. Terminal 2B can receive 3.5 million passengers a year, with its seven gates and five remote stands.

Public to public-private ownership (2000–2012)

On 8 December 2005, a 75% stake in Ferihegy Airport was bought by BAA plc for 464.5 billion HUF (approx. US$2.1 billion), including the right of operation for 75 years. 
On 20 October 2006, BAA announced intentions to sell its stake in Budapest Airport to a consortium led by the German airport group, HOCHTIEF AirPort GmbH, subject to the consent of the Hungarian State. 

On 18 April 2007, the renovation of Terminal 1 at Ferihegy was awarded Europe's most prestigious heritage preservation prize, the Europa Nostra award. The designers, contractors, builders and investors (the latter being BA) received the joint award of the European Commission and of the pan-European heritage preservation organisation Europa Nostra for the renovation of the protected monument spaces, the central hall, the gallery and the furniture at T1.

On 6 June 2007, BAA and a consortium led by HOCHTIEF AirPort (HTA) formally closed and completed the transaction of the sale of BAA's shares in Budapest Airport (BA) to the HOCHTIEF AirPort Consortium. The ownership of the HOCHTIEF AirPort Consortium was as follows: HOCHTIEF AirPort (49.666%) and three financial investors: Caisse de dépôt et placement du Québec, Montreal (23.167%), GIC Special Investments, Singapore (23.167%) and KfW IPEX-Bank, Frankfurt (4.0%).

On 26 July 2010, after completing a security oversight investigation in May, the EU authorities revoked Budapest Airport's official "Schengen Clear" certification, due to serious lapses observed in personal security check procedures and unauthorised passing of banned objects. This meant passenger connecting via another airport in the Schengen Zone would have to be rescreened through security, just as foreign non-Schengen connecting passengers, causing delays and inconvenience. The airport argued that it had not yet had time to fully implement new security measures introduced on 29 April 2010, and inspired by the Delta Air Lines' Amsterdam "underwear bomb scare" incident. The airport's layout was also cited as an excuse for the failure. Budapest Airport was the first airport to be checked through a stringent undercover evaluation for compliance with the new regulation. (Hungarian state news agency MTI reports) In response, additional security measures were immediately implemented at Budapest Airport causing flight delays at both terminals. Unusually long passenger waiting queues were observed at the busier 2A-B terminal complex's departures area. These problems were solved over time, especially through the opening of the SkyCourt terminal including a central security zone. 

On 15 November 2010, Budapest Airport regained the "Schengen Clear"-status, after implementing the necessary security actions and after that, the airport underwent the strict re-inspection.

On 16 March 2011, the name of Budapest Ferihegy International Airport was changed to Budapest Ferenc Liszt International Airport.[2]

Sky Court, the new expansion project including shops, restaurants and lounges, also connecting Terminals 2A and 2B was opened on 27 March 2011. In summer that year, the refurbishing of the old terminal parts in T2 began and was completed in 2012.

Collapse of Malév and aftermath (2012–)
In the wake of the collapse of Malév, Ryanair announced that it would expand its flights to Liszt airport. Ryanair began selling the flight tickets to the public, but Budapest airport said that the company had not secured all of the necessary slots (which were later negotiated successfully). By 9 February 2012, only six days after the collapse of the Hungarian national carrier, Liszt Ferenc Airport had recovered over 60% of its point to point traffic. Airlines that announced that new services would begin included Wizz Air, Aegean Airlines, Air Berlin, Lufthansa, and Ryanair.

However, the airport had lost Malév's transfer passengers, which, prior to the airline's collapse, had amounted to 1.5 million passengers per year. A second effect of the Malév collapse was that the areas used to service the Malév fleet would no longer generate revenue even once point to point traffic had been restored. These factors created significant financial shortfalls in the airport's revenues.

In February 2012, Hainan Airlines announced that they would cease services to Beijing from Budapest. Prior to the collapse of Malév, Hainan had a partnership with Malév, which included a codeshare.

In May 2013, Hochtief Group announced the sale of its Airports unit HOCHTIEF AirPort which held a stake in the Budapest Airport and other airports to the Canadian Pension fund Public Sector Pension Investment Board (PSP Investments). Following the sale HOCHTIEF AirPort was renamed AviAlliance.

From June 2015, transatlantic flights were restored with two carriers flying to Toronto and Montreal.

As of July 2015, the ownership of Budapest Airport is as follows: AviAlliance (52.666%) owned by PSP Investments, Canada, Malton Investment (22.167%) owned by GIC Special Investments, Singapore, Caisse de dépôt et placement du Québec, Canada (20.167%) and KfW IPEX-Bank, Germany (5%).

Latest developments, opening of LOT Polish Airlines’ base

An expenditure of 261 million euros was spent to expanding and modernizing the airports infrastructure until December 2012. Several of these future projects involve about further 300 million euros, and depends on regulatory decisions as well as third-party investors. Since 2011, several projects have been completed, including the refurbishment of Terminals 2A and 2B including the inauguration of the Skycourt main departures hall in 2012 and an extension of Terminal 2B in 2018, the construction of a new business and cargo area called Budapest Airport Business Park as well as a new airport hotel and expanded car parking facilities.

In 2014, Emirates opened daily flights to Dubai, UAE using the Boeing 777-300ER aircraft. It was followed by Air China's flights to Beijing Capital and an Air Transat connection to Toronto Pearson, both using the Airbus A330. As a response to that, Air Canada started their operation to Budapest by Air Canada Rouge operated by the Boeing 767-300. By 2017, Air Canada Rouge has taken over the market completely.

In July 2017, LOT Polish Airlines announced the commencement of direct flights to Chicago and New York, making them the first flights to the United States since Delta and American Airlines stopped flying to Budapest in 2011. New York is served four times, Chicago twice a week with LOT's flagship Boeing 787 Dreamliner. In the same year, the airline added connections to Kraków and London–City. Right after LOT, American Airlines announced their seasonal new flight to Philadelphia Airport which is operated by their Boeing 767 aircraft. In 2020, the airline opened their new route to Chicago with the Boeing 787 Dreamliner. In 2019, Shanghai Airlines launched a four-time weekly service to Shanghai–Pudong also with the Boeing 787 Dreamliner. In 2019, LOT Polish Airlines announced a massive expansion program with new flights to Belgrade, Brussels, Bucharest, Prague, Seoul–Incheon, Stuttgart and Sofia. The flights will be operated by the airline's Boeing 787 Dreamliner and the Embraer E-Jet family. The inaugural flight to Seoul–Incheon was on Sunday 22nd September 2019, operating as LO2001.

Future 
There are further projects for the expansion of the airport, including a new cargo facilities area as well as a new Terminal 3, formerly called Terminal 2C and originally planned by 2020. In a 2021 interview, however, the newly appointed CEO stated that the construction of the new passenger hall could commence in 2025.

In 2020, according to a report from Bloomberg, it was reported that the Hungarian government was looking at buying the airport from its foreign owners such as GIC (Singaporean sovereign wealth fund) and Canadian AviAlliance. Prime Minister Viktor Orbán was opposed to the 2005 privatization.

Terminals

The airport's passenger buildings consist of four main areas:
 Terminal 1 is only used for charter and private flights
 Terminal 2A is used for flights inside the Schengen Area
 Terminal 2B is used for flights outside the Schengen Area
 Sky Court, a large central waiting and shopping area, also the connection of Terminals 2A and 2B

Terminal 1 (closed) 
From 1 September 2005, re-opened Terminal 1 served low-cost carriers. Terminal 1 is divided into Schengen and Non-Schengen boarding gates.

Being located within the premises of Budapest, it offers faster public transport time to the city center, compared to the Terminal 2 about 3 kilometres farther. (Terminal 1 offers an about 20 minutes direct train journey to Budapest city center, while Terminal 2 requires an 8-minute bus ride to the train station).

On 14 March 2012, Budapest Airport announced that due to the traffic levels being too low in Terminal 1, extra capacity in Terminal 2, and cost saving, Terminal 1 will be closed temporarily. On 30 May 2012 all airlines were moved to Terminal 2, the low-cost airlines using now the check-in desks at hall 2B and gates at a makeshift shed outside the main building. This shed now does not operate, a new pier was opened instead.

Sky Court between Terminal 2A and 2B 
Sky Court is a state-of-the-art building between terminals 2A and 2B with 5 levels. Passenger safety checks were moved here along with new baggage classifiers and business class lounges, such as the first MasterCard lounge in Europe. New shops, restaurants and cafés were placed in the new building's transit hall. With the opening of Skycourt the Terminal 2 has become capable of receiving about 11 million passengers a year, instead of the former joint capacity of about 7 million.

Terminal 2A 
The Schengen terminal, and formerly the "only" Terminal 2. It was inaugurated on 1 November 1985 for the exclusive use of the homeland carrier Malév Hungarian Airlines, and later renamed in 1998 to Terminal 2A. Its check-in hall serves all Skyteam and Star Alliance member airlines currently. Within its boarding area (Gates A1-A33) and arrivals level, it serves all flights to and from the Schengen-zone destinations of any airline.

Terminal 2B 
The non-Schengen terminal, it is referred to as a separate object, opened in December 1998. Its check-in hall serves all flights of the OneWorld-alliance (intra- and extra-Schengen as well), as well as many other non-aligned airlines. For flights of the Hungarian low-cost airliner Wizz Air check-in desks can also be found at this terminal. However, its boarding (Gates B1-B44) and arriving area serve exclusively non-Schengen destinations.

Pier 2B 
The project "Pier B" was started on 9 January 2017. The new state-of-the-art building was opened on 1 August 2018, and it is connected directly to Terminal 2B. It is 220 meters long and it includes 27 boarding gates and 10 jetbridges, which can serve more wide-body aircraft at the same time. The pier was planned to offer flexibility for traditional and low-cost airlines with boarding options via jetbridges, buses or walking directly to the aircraft.

Airlines and destinations

Passenger

As of May 2022, the following airlines operate regular scheduled and charter services to and from Budapest Ferenc Liszt Airport:

Cargo

Statistics

Traffic figures

Top destinations

Other facilities
 Wizz Air has its head office in Building 221. Wizz Air signed the lease agreement in October 2010 and moved there in June 2011 with 150 employees. The facility, with open plan offices, houses about 150 employees. In addition, Farnair Hungary has its head office on the airport property.
 Malév Hungarian Airlines signed a lease agreement with the airport in the spring of 2011, agreeing to relocate its headquarters to the airport grounds by the summer of 2012. Due to the collapse of the airline, in February 2012 the plans to move to Ferenc Liszt were cancelled.

Ground transportation

Public transport

Local buses

Budapesti Közlekedési Központ (BKK), the public transit authority for Budapest, operates two major express bus services to the airport: 100E and 
200E. Route 100E—modeled after the OrlyBus and RoissyBus airport bus services in Paris—provides nonstop service to the city center, stopping only at Kálvin tér and Deák Ferenc tér. Standard tickets and passes cannot be used on this route; a higher-fare ticket must be bought on board or at the airport's BKK ticket machines.

Bus route 200E provides service from the airport to Kőbánya-Kispest station, the nearest station of the Budapest Metro. Standard tickets and passes are valid on this route.

Long-distance buses
Flixbus operates long-distance routes from the airport to numerous Central European cities, including Prague, Vienna, Timișoara, and Sibiu.

Rail
Hungarian State Railways (MÁV) services stop at the nearby Ferihegy railway station, which can be accessed from Terminal 2 by bus route 200E. Trips into the city center from Ferihegy station take approximately 25 minutes, but service is infrequent. Ferihegy station formerly served the airport's Terminal 1, which no longer hosts passenger air services.

Taxi
Budapest Airport's official Taxi partner is Főtaxi which has a taxi order stand at both arrival site's exit (outside the building).

Mini buses and shuttles
Several companies operate airport shuttles taking passengers to any destination in the city. Other shuttles and coach services exist to outlying towns in Hungary, Romania, Slovakia, and Serbia.

See also
 List of airports in Hungary
 Transport in Hungary
 Aeropark aviation museum

References

External links

 Official website
 
 

1950 establishments in Hungary
Airports established in 1950
Airports in Hungary
Transport in Budapest
History of Budapest
Airfields of the United States Army Air Forces Air Transport Command in the European Theater
Franz Liszt